Mawsata, Mausata, or the Mawsata State, was a state in the British Aden Protectorate. Mawsata was located in the western and southwestern part of Upper Yafa. The main mountain in the area is Jabal Darfan.

Mawsata was the most populated of the five sheikhdoms of Upper Yafa. The last ruler was deposed in 1967 upon the founding of the People's Republic of South Yemen and the area is now part of the Republic of Yemen.

History
The State of Mawsata (Dawlat Mawsata) was established in 1780. Owing to family dissensions, in 1860 the ruling family was divided into two lineages. Around 1904 the state became a British protectorate.

Mawsata was part of the Protectorate of South Arabia until 1967 when it was abolished.

Rulers
The ruler of Mawsata State bore the title Naqib.

1780 - 1810                al-Qasim Al Harhara 
1810 - 1840                `Ali ibn al-Qasim Al Harhara 
1840 - 1860                `Askar ibn `Ali Al Harhara

Lineage 1  
1860 - 1907                `Ali ibn `Askar Al Harhara 
1907 - 1940                Naji ibn `Ali ibn `Askar Al Harhara 
1940 - Jan 1963            Ahmad ibn Abi Bakr ibn `Ali Al Harhara 
Feb 1963 - Jun 1967        `Aydarus ibn Ahmad Al Harhara

Lineage 2   
1860 - 1920                Muhsin ibn `Askar Al Harhara 
1920 - 1946                Muhammad ibn Muhsin ibn `Askar Al Harhara 
1946 - 1959                al-Husayn ibn Salih ibn Muhsin Al Harhara 
1959 - Jun 1967            Salih ibn al-Husayn ibn Salih Al Harhara

See also
Aden Protectorate
Upper Yafa

References

External links
Map of Arabia (1905-1923) including the states of Aden Protectorate

States in the Aden Protectorate
Federation of South Arabia
Former countries
Former monarchies